James Smythe (born 1980) is a British science fiction novelist known for The Anomaly Quartet, and the Australia series for young adults. James lives in London and teaches creative writing.

Smythe's novel The Machine was nominated for The Kitschies Red Tentacle Award in 2013, and The Testimony was named Wales Fiction Book of the Year in 2013. The Machine was a finalist for the Arthur C. Clarke Award in 2014, and Way Down Dark was also a finalist for the same award in 2016.

Bibliography 
 Hereditation (2009)
 The Testimony (2012)
 The Machine (2013)
 No Harm Can Come to a Good Man (2014)
 I Still Dream (2018)
 The Anomaly Quartet
 The Explorer (2012)
 The Echo (2014)
 The Edge (2021)
 The Ends (2022)

 Australia series [as J. P. Smythe]
 Way Down Dark (2015)
 Long Dark Dusk (2016)
 Dark Made Dawn (2016)

References

External links
 

21st-century British novelists
British science fiction writers
1980 births
Living people